The 2008 World Women's Curling Championship (branded as 2008 Ford World Women's Curling Championship for sponsorship reasons) was held from March 22 to March 30, 2008 at the Wesbild Centre in Vernon, British Columbia, Canada.  This championship also served as one of the qualifiers for the 2010 Winter Olympics.

Teams

Round-robin standings

Round-robin results

Draw 1
March 22, 13:00

Draw 2
March 22, 18:00

Draw 3
March 23, 10:30

Draw 4
March 23, 16:00

Draw 5
March 23, 20:00

Draw 6
March 24, 8:30

{{ Curlingbox
| sheet = D
| team1 =  (Munro)
| 2|0|1|1|0|0|1|0|2|0| |7
| team2 =  (McCormick)' 
| 0|1|0|0|3|1|0|2|0|2| |9
}}

Draw 7March 24, 1:00 PMDraw 8March 24, 18:30Draw 9March 25, 8:30Draw 10March 25 13:00Draw 11March 25, 18:00Draw 12March 26, 8:30 AMDraw 13March 26, 13:00Draw 14March 26, 18:00Draw 15March 27, 8:30Draw 16March 27, 13:00Draw 17March 27, 18:00''

Tiebreaker

Playoffs

3 vs. 4

1 vs. 2

Semifinal

Bronze medal game

Gold medal game

Player percentages
Top five percentages per position during the round robin.

Broadcasts
Seven broadcasters presented the games both live and tape-delayed via television and the internet.  Eurosport (Europe), NHK (Japan), TSN and CBC (Canada), WCSN and NBCOlympics.com (USA) and CurlTV.com (internet).

See also
 2008 Brier
 2008 World Men's Curling Championship
 2008 World Junior Curling Championships
 2008 World Mixed Doubles Curling Championship
 2008 Scotties Tournament of Hearts

References

External links
 
 
 Tournament coverage on TSN

Sport in Vernon, British Columbia
World Women's Curling Championship
2008 Women
Curling in British Columbia
2008 in British Columbia
March 2008 sports events in Canada
Women's curling competitions in Canada
2008 in women's curling
Sports competitions in British Columbia
International sports competitions hosted by Canada
2008 in Canadian women's sports